Igor V. Dolgachev (born 7 April 1944) is a Russian–American mathematician specializing in algebraic geometry.  He has been a professor at the University of Michigan since 1978. He introduced Dolgachev surfaces in 1981.

Dolgachev completed his Ph.D. at Moscow State University in 1970, with thesis On the purity of the degeneration locus of families of curves written under the supervision of Igor Shafarevich.

References

External links
Dolgachev's website at University of Michigan

1944 births
Living people
Moscow State University alumni
Soviet mathematicians
Russian mathematicians
20th-century American mathematicians
21st-century American mathematicians
University of Michigan faculty
Algebraic geometers